"Semper Paratus" (Latin for "Always Ready") is a 1928 song and the official march of the United States Coast Guard, having been composed in 1927 by U.S. Coast Guard Captain Francis Saltus Van Boskerck.

Etymology
Semper Paratus is the title of the song and is also the U.S. Coast Guard's official motto. The precise origin of the phrase is obscure, although the U.S. Coast Guard Historian's Office notes the first use was by the New Orleans Bee newspaper in 1836, in reference to the actions of the U.S. Revenue Cutter Service during the Ingham incident.

History

Composition

Lyrical modifications
The current verse, as well as a second chorus, were written by Homer Smith, 3rd Naval District Coast Guard quartet; Chief Cole; and Lieutenant Walton Butterfield in 1943. In 1969, the first line of the chorus was changed from “So here's the Coast Guard marching song, We sing on land and sea.” to “We're always ready for the call, We place our trust in Thee.”

Lyrics

Verse 1
 From Aztec Shore to Arctic Zone,
 To Europe and Far East,
 The Flag is carried by our ships
 In times of war and peace;
 And never have we struck it yet,
 In spite of foemen's might,
 Who cheered our crews and cheered again
 For showing how to fight.

Chorus
 We're always ready for the call,
 We place our trust in Thee.
 Through surf and storm and howling gale,
 High shall our purpose be,
 "Semper Paratus" is our guide,
 Our fame, our glory, too.
 To fight to save or fight and die!
 Aye! Coast Guard, we are for you.

Verse 2
 "Surveyor" and "Narcissus,"
 The "Eagle" and "Dispatch,"
 The "Hudson" and the "Tampa,"
 These names are hard to match;
 From Barrow's shores to Paraguay,
 Great Lakes or Ocean's wave,
 The Coast Guard fights through storms and winds
 To punish or to save.

Verse 3
 Aye! We've been "Always Ready"
 To do, to fight, or die!
 Write glory to the shield we wear
 In letters to the sky.
 To sink the foe or save the maimed
 Our mission and our pride.
 We'll carry on 'til Kingdom Come
 Ideals for which we've died.

See also

"Marines' Hymn"
"The U.S. Air Force"
"Anchors Aweigh"
"The Army Goes Rolling Along"
"Semper Supra"
A Girl in Every Port (1928 film)

Notes

Citations

Sources

External links

Semper Paratus (MIDI and all versions of the lyrics)
Semper Paratus (WAV)
Semper Paratus (sheet music)

1927 songs
American military marches
United States Coast Guard
American patriotic songs